The CIFAR-10 dataset (Canadian Institute For Advanced Research) is a collection of images that are commonly used to train machine learning and computer vision algorithms. It is one of the most widely used datasets for machine learning research. The CIFAR-10 dataset contains 60,000 32x32 color images in 10 different classes. The 10 different classes represent airplanes, cars, birds, cats, deer, dogs, frogs, horses, ships, and trucks. There are 6,000 images of each class.

Computer algorithms for recognizing objects in photos often learn by example. CIFAR-10 is a set of images that can be used to teach a computer how to recognize objects. Since the images in CIFAR-10 are low-resolution (32x32), this dataset can allow researchers to quickly try different algorithms to see what works.

CIFAR-10 is a labeled subset of the 80 million tiny images dataset. When the dataset was created, students were paid to label all of the images.

Various kinds of convolutional neural networks tend to be the best at recognizing the images in CIFAR-10.

Research papers claiming state-of-the-art results on CIFAR-10 

This is a table of some of the research papers that claim to have achieved state-of-the-art results on the CIFAR-10 dataset. Not all papers are standardized on the same pre-processing techniques, like image flipping or image shifting. For that reason, it is possible that one paper's claim of state-of-the-art could have a higher error rate than an older state-of-the-art claim but still be valid.

Benchmarks 
CIFAR-10 is also used as a performance benchmark for teams competing to run neural networks faster and cheaper. DAWNBench has benchmark data on their website.

See also 
 List of datasets for machine learning research
 MNIST database

References

External links 
 CIFAR-10 page - The home of the dataset
 Canadian Institute For Advanced Research

Similar datasets 
 CIFAR-100: Similar to CIFAR-10 but with 100 classes and 600 images each.
 ImageNet (ILSVRC): 1 million color images of 1000 classes. Imagenet images are higher resolution, averaging 469x387 resolution.
 Street View House Numbers (SVHN): Approximately 600,000 images of 10 classes (digits 0-9). Also 32x32 color images.
 80 million tiny images dataset: CIFAR-10 is a labeled subset of this dataset.

Datasets in computer vision